Hafdís Sigurðardóttir (born 24 May 1989) is an Icelandic professional racing cyclist. She rode in the women's road race event at the 2020 UCI Road World Championships.

References

1989 births
Living people
Hafdis Sigardardottir
Place of birth missing (living people)
20th-century Icelandic women
21st-century Icelandic women